Leninsky Avenue (Leninsky prospekt) or Lenin Avenue (Prospekt Lenina) was a common name for major avenues in many cities of the former Soviet Union commemorating Vladimir Lenin.  there were about 20 Leninsky Avenues and over 100 Lenin Avenues in Russia.

Notable avenues include:

In Russia
Leninsky Avenue, an avenue in Moscow
, an avenue in Saint Petersburg
, an avenue in Voronezh
, an avenue in Vyborg
Lenin Avenue, an avenue in Yekaterinburg

In other countries
, main avenue in Gomel
, an avenue in Donetsk
 Leninsky Avenue was the 1961−1991 name of the Independence Avenue in Minsk.
 Lenin Avenue was the Soviet-times name of the Dostyq Avenue in Almaty.
 Lenin Avenue was the pre-1992 name of the Rudaki Avenue in Dushanbe.
 Lenin Avenue was the Soviet-times name of the Mashtots Avenue in Yerevan.
 Lenin Avenue was the Soviet-times name of the Gediminas Avenue in Vilnius.

Several train and metro stations are named Leninsky Avenue or Lenin Avenue:
Leninsky Prospekt (Moscow Metro), a metro station in Moscow
Leninsky Prospekt (Saint Petersburg Metro), a metro station in Saint Petersburg

See also
Lenin Street, Novosibirsk
Leninsky (disambiguation)
Lenin Square (disambiguation)
List of places named after Vladimir Lenin

References